Aureimonas jatrophae is a bacterium from the genus of Aurantimonas which was isolated from the plant Jatropha curcas Linnaeus in the Agrotechnology Experimental Station of Lim Chu Kang in Singapore.

References

External links
Type strain of Aureimonas jatrophae at BacDive -  the Bacterial Diversity Metadatabase

Hyphomicrobiales
Bacteria described in 2013